Sorry is a 2007 novel by Australian author Gail Jones.

Themes

The novel explores the major themes of Australian Aboriginal-White relations, the isolation and despair of farm life, the Stolen Generations, and life during World War II in Australia.

Dedication
"For Veronica Brady."

Awards

Miles Franklin Literary Award, 2008: shortlisted 
Orange Prize for Fiction (UK), 2008: longlisted 
Nita Kibble Literary Award, 2008: shortlisted 
Prime Minister's Literary Awards, Fiction, 2008: shortlisted

Reviews

"The Age" 
"The Australian" 
"The Sydney Morning Herald" 
"The Telegraph" 

2007 Australian novels
Novels set in Australia
Novels set during World War II
Novels by Gail Jones